Elections to the Labour Party's Shadow Cabinet (more formally, its "Parliamentary Committee") took place on 19 November 1981. There were 15 posts, rather than 12 as in previous years. In addition to the 15 members elected, the Leader (Michael Foot), Deputy Leader (Denis Healey), Labour Chief Whip (Michael Cocks), Labour Leader in the House of Lords (Lord Peart), and Chairman of the Parliamentary Labour Party (Jack Dormand) were automatically members.

Of the 12 incumbent members, 10 were re-elected. Tony Benn, who was the top loser in 1980 automatically took the Bill Rodgers when the latter left the party to create the Social Democratic Party. He lost again in this election. It is unclear whether Roy Mason lost re-election or did not stand. The results of the election, though incomplete, are below

Tony Benn had narrowly failed to defeat Denis Healey for the deputy leadership of the Labour Party a few months earlier. Shortly before the shadow cabinet election, Benn had broken with Michael Foot and the shadow cabinet by committing a future Labour Government to nationalising oil and gas assets without compensation, despite not having authorisation to do so.  Benn then refused to commit to supporting collective shadow cabinet responsibility, causing Foot to announce  a week prior to the ballot that he was personally opposed to Benn being re-elected to the shadow cabinet  The Glasgow Herald reported Benn planned to use the contest to renew his campaign against Healey, and that Foot believed that Benn ultimately would challenge him for the leadership of the Labour Party.

While Benn failed to be elected to the shadow cabinet, the size of his vote was reported as being a blow to Michael Foot, given that he had withdrawn his support from him and encouraged party colleagues to do likewise. Benn claimed to be pleased with the size of his vote, which represented a quarter of the parliamentary party, which he claimed was twice as great as he had expected. The Glasgow Herald noted that other than Foot, only five of those elected could be described as "Left-wingers". In contrast 8 members, including deputy leader Healey, were identified as "Right-wingers" and three members (Dunwoody, Millan and Shore) who were "Centre-to-right".

References

1981
Labour Party Shadow Cabinet election
Labour Party Shadow Cabinet election